Goretti is both a feminine given name and an Italian surname. Notable people with the surname include:

Surname 
 Beatrice Ancillotti Goretti (1879–1937), Italian painter 
 Maria Goretti (1890–1902), Italian virgin-martyr of the Roman Catholic Church
 Maria Goretti (actress), Indian VJ and actress
 Martino Goretti ((born 1985), Italian rower
 Sergio Goretti (1929-2012), Italian Catholic bishop
 Roberto Goretti (born 1976), Italian footballer
 Vittorio Goretti (1939–2016), Italian amateur astronomer

Given name 
 Goretti Chadwick, Samoan-New Zealand actress, writer, director and tutor
 Goretti Donaire, Spanish football player
 Goretti Horgan, Irish socialist activist and lecturer
 Goretti Kyomuhendo (born 1965), Ugandan novelist and literary activist
 Goretti Nassanga, Ugandan journalist, academic and academic administrator
 Goretti Zumaya (born 1997), Mexican sports shooter

Feminine given names
Italian-language surnames